Luther Berryhill Davis (August 29, 1916 – July 29, 2008) was an American playwright and screenwriter.

Early life an education
Davis was born in Brooklyn, New York. He graduated from Culver Military Academy in 1934 and received a bachelor of arts from Yale College in 1938. He served in the United States Army Air Forces until 1945, rising to the rank of major. While in the army air forces, he served in Asia and Europe.

Career
In collaboration with Charles Lederer, Robert Wright, and George Forrest, Luther Davis wrote Kismet, Timbuktu!, and two different treatments of Vicki Baum’s novel Grand Hotel (At the Grand for the Los Angeles and San Francisco Light Opera Association and the Broadway musical version, Grand Hotel, The Musical).

He received two Tony Awards in 1954 (with Lederer) for Kismet as Best Author (Musical) and as co-author of the book contributed to the Best Musical win. He was nominated again in 1978, for Most Innovative Production of a Revival, as producer of Timbuktu!, and in 1990 as author of the Best Book (Musical) for Grand Hotel, The Musical.

He wrote fifteen movies, many television specials and co-produced Stephen MacDonald’s Off-Broadway play, Not About Heroes.

He won two Mystery Writers of America Edgar Awards and was nominated many times by the Writers Guild of America and the League of American Theatres and Producers.

He was the father of two daughters and was married to soap opera actress Jennifer Bassey, his companion since 1978, from 2004 until his death.

Credits

Stage plays
Kiss Them for Me (March 20, 1945 – June 23, 1945)
New Faces of 1952 (May 16, 1952 – March 28, 1953)
Kismet (December 3, 1953 – April 23, 1955)
Timbuktu!  (March 1, 1978 – September 10, 1978)
Grand Hotel  (November 12, 1989 – April 25, 1992)

Screenplays
The Hucksters (1947)
B.F.'s Daughter (1948)
Black Hand (1950)
A Lion Is in the Streets (1953)
New Faces (1954)
Kismet (1955)
The Eternal Sea (1955)
Kiss Them for Me (1957)
The Gift of Love (1958)
Holiday for Lovers (1959)
Le Meraviglie Di Aladino (1961)
Lady in a Cage (1964)
Daughter of the Mind  (1969)
The Old Man Who Cried Wolf (1970)
The Silent Force (TV series) (1970-1971)
Across 110th Street (1972)

Creator
The Silent Force (TV series) (1970-1971)

References

External links

1916 births
2008 deaths
20th-century American dramatists and playwrights
American male screenwriters
People from Brooklyn
Place of death missing
Edgar Award winners
Tony Award winners
American male dramatists and playwrights
20th-century American male writers
Screenwriters from New York (state)
Culver Academies alumni
20th-century American screenwriters
United States Army Air Forces officers
United States Army Air Forces personnel of World War II
Yale College alumni